Lactarius chelidonium is a member of the large milk-cap genus Lactarius in the order Russulales. It was first described by American mycologist Charles Horton Peck in 1870.

See also
List of Lactarius species

References

External links

chelidonium
Fungi described in 1872
Fungi of North America
Taxa named by Charles Horton Peck